Paul Kiprop Kirui (born February 5, 1980) is a Kenyan distance and marathon runner. He participated at the IAAF World Half Marathon Championships in 2004 and finished first place. He had participated the World Half Marathon Championships twice before; in 2002 he finished 10th, but the next year he did not finish. His marathon personal best is 2:06:44, set in 2006 Rotterdam Marathon, when he finished 2nd behind compatriot Sammy Korir.

Kirui reached the podium at the 2010 Seoul International Marathon, taking third in 2:07:35 – his quickest time in three years.

Marathon record 
2005 Venice Marathon - 5th
2005 Milan Marathon - 2nd
2006 Rotterdam Marathon - 2nd (time 2:06:44, PB)
2006 JoongAng Seoul Marathon - 2nd
2008 Rotterdam Marathon - 5th
2008 Amsterdam Marathon - 1st
2009 Rome Marathon - 2nd

Half marathon record 
2002 IAAF World Half Marathon Championships (Brussels, BEL) - 1st
2003 Berlin Half Marathon - 1st.
2003 IAAF World Half Marathon Championships (Vilamoura, POR) - DNF
2004 Berlin Half Marathon - 1st
2004 IAAF World Half Marathon Championships (New Delhi, IND) - 1st

References

External links
 
 Marathoninfo profile
 Rosa & Associati profile

1980 births
Living people
Kenyan male long-distance runners
Kenyan male marathon runners
World Athletics Half Marathon Championships winners